Wessel + O'Connor Fine Art, sometimes styled Wessel O'Connor is an art gallery that began in Rome in 1985, which was known for providing East Village artists with their first European exhibits. Jointly owned by John Wessel (1941–2011) and William C. O’Connor, the gallery subsequently operated in locations in: Tribeca, SoHo, Chelsea, Dumbo, Lambertville, New Jersey, and Doylestown, Pennsylvania. As of December 2017, it is located in Lahaska, Pennsylvania.

In their early years, they were known for being one of the few gay art galleries.

While at its SoHo location, the gallery became known for its queer identity art. Among the artists it showed was Christopher Ciccone, Madonna's brother.

References

External links
 

1985 establishments in Italy
Art galleries established in 1985
Art museums and galleries in Rome
Art museums and galleries in New York City
Art museums and galleries in New Jersey
Art museums and galleries in Pennsylvania
Contemporary art galleries in the United States
LGBT art in the United States